

Eadhun was a medieval Bishop of Winchester. He was consecrated between 833 and 838. He died in 838.

Citations

References

External links
 

Bishops of Winchester
838 deaths
9th-century English bishops
Year of birth unknown